Designed by Aurelio Lampredi, the Fiat SOHC engine first appeared in the front-wheel drive (FWD) Fiat 128 of 1969. The in-line four-cylinder engine comprised an iron block with an aluminium cylinder-head containing a single overhead camshaft operating directly on both the inlet and exhaust valves in a reverse-flow cylinder-head configuration. The camshaft was driven by a belt rather than chain. The engine remained in production until about 2010 and grew in capacity over the years from 1100 cc (in the Fiat 128) to an eventual 1900 cc (in the Fiat Linea). The Fiat 130  V6 engine, also appearing in 1969, although having crossflow cylinder head, is directly related to the 128 SOHC engine, but with a 1.20 upscale in bore and stroke. It was gradually replaced by the Pratola Serra engine series starting from 1995 (and in the 1100 cc guise, by the FIRE unit of comparable displacement), although it was also converted to use a multivalve DOHC head, giving birth to the Torque engine, used until 2005.

Design and production

The engine was designed as a transversely-mounted FWD-only power-plant being the second engine/gearbox combination to exhibit the now standard transverse engine-next-to-gearbox layout with unequal length driveshafts (the first was the Autobianchi Primula, the Mini had its gearbox in the sump of the engine). The exception to the engines FWD-only design is its revolutionary use as a mid-engine drive-train in the Fiat X1/9. Also Tofaş has adapted 128 engines into its Fiat 131 based longitudinally-mounted, front-engine, rear-wheel-drive layout platform. Unusual for the time was the electrically driven fan, rather than it being powered directly by the engine. The 128 engine has five crankshaft bearings.

A prominent feature of the Fiat SOHC engine is its massively over-square proportions. This over-square design allows large (within the constrains of a reverse-flow configuration) valve sizes relative to engine capacity. A secondary benefit is the short crank throw reduces the accelerative forces on the con-rod allowing the engine to operate at significantly increased engine-speeds. The original engine's limit was only reached at 8000 rpm.

The  version was turbocharged and used in the Fiat Uno Turbo. The  unit was also turbocharged and first used in the MkII Uno Turbo, then in the Punto GT.

As with its bigger brother the famous Fiat DOHC (aka Fiat/Lancia Twincam) engine, the Fiat SOHC engine was shared with the Fiat subsidiary Lancia (appearing in 1,500 cc guise in the Lancia Delta/Prisma of the 1980s) as well as being used in the Fiat 128 derived Yugo.

The final incarnation of the 128 SOHC engine was modified to use 16 valves and double overhead camshafts. The engine (using the designation "Torque") initially featured the bore-spacing, bore and stroke of the  159/160 series engine with a new 16 valve DOHC crossflow cylinder-head. To incorporate the extra oil-return-paths and symmetrical head (as opposed to the asymmetrical SOHC head) the cylinder-block was slightly revised making the DOHC head non-interchangeable with the previous incarnations of the 128 engine. It powered the Brava/Bravo, Marea and Multipla Fiat automobiles as well as the second-generation Lancia Delta. It was then replaced with a version based on the 1372 block with a longer stroke, displacing , ending production in 2005. The same stroke of the later version was also used in Brazil with the earlier Torque block, giving birth to an  version, used in the Linea.

Engine specification
The Fiat SOHC engine was produced in a number of configurations differing in stroke and bore but maintaining a standard bore-spacing. This engine was later used in the X1/9. The original  128/X1/9 engine is the only one of the family to have used the  bore. The second generation used bores of either  with strokes of  giving four possible engine capacities. The final generation of SOHC engines standardised on a longer  stroke with either an  bore (giving  respectively). The  stroke with the  bore was subsequently used by the early Torque engines, while the later Torque units used an  bore with a  stroke.

Applications
List of vehicles using variations of the Fiat SOHC engine.

Fiat
 Fiat 128: 1969-1985
 Fiat X1/9: 1972-1989
 Fiat Ritmo/Strada: 1978-1988
 Fiat 131 Mirafiori: 1980-1984
 Fiat 147: 1982 (Argentina)
 Fiat Uno: 1983-1989
 Fiat Regata: 1985-1990
 Fiat Spazio/Vivace: 1991-1996
 Fiat Tipo: 1988-1995
 Fiat Tempra: 1990-1995
 Punto Mk I: 1993-1999
 Fiat Palio/Siena: 1996-2002

Lancia
Lancia Delta: 1979-1994
Lancia Prisma: 1980s
Lancia Dedra: 1990-1998

Zastava
Yugo 55
Yugo 60
Yugo 65
Zastava 101
Zastava 128
Zastava Florida
Yugo Sana 1.3 1.4

Tofaş
Tofaş Şahin/Doğan/Kartal: 1992-2002

Induction

Production

The Fiat SOHC used the full gamut of induction techniques through its long production run. The original 128 and 138 series engines originally used a single down-draught carburettor. The carburettor was normally of progressive twin-choke design (two asymmetric sized chokes operated progressively) such as the Weber DMTR and DATR of the X1/9. Multi-point fuel injection (MPI) was introduced late in the 138 series to help meet lowered emission requirements in the US. The original MPI system comprised a large cylindrical plenum running parallel to the engine with individual runners to each inlet port and a single throttle controlling air-flow into the plenum. This plenum was pressurised in the Mk I Uno Turbo. The plenum was slightly redesigned to a more angular "box" shape for the 3rd Generation engines and was again pressurised for the Uno and Punto GT Turbo models. For the 3rd Generation engines the down-draft carburettor was replaced with a Single-point injection system (SPI) in the base-level models. The SPI system mounts on a manifold similar to that of the carburetted models and looks, as well as acts, much like a single-choke carburettor with a single throttle plate but no venturi and a centrally mounted single injector.

Tuning & modification
Since the Fiat SOHC engine series was produced for a long time and has been in a lot of cars it was just matter of time before people realized you can tune them fairly easily

They are oversquared by design, SOHC heads flow very well and 1500/1600sohc engines come with forged rods

The Fiat Tipo/Tempra/Punto 1.6 8v (75-90hp) is commonly used as a base because it's easily accessible and is de-tuned from factory (especially the 75hp versions) leaving tuners with a lot of headroom for horsepower increase

Common modifications are: swapping to a better carburetor, using a higher overlap/lift camshaft, bigger intake/exhaust valves, lowering the head to increase compression and a tuned 4-2-1 exhaust manifold

Most of these modifications are very cheap to do since you can use the parts from Fiat/Zastava parts bin

Carburettor
Traditionally both down-draft (DCNF & IDF) and side-draft (DCOE) twin-choke carburettors have been used to extract more power from the 128 derived engines. IDFs are rarely used due to an incorrect orientation of the float-bowls (causing possible surge/starve issues under cornering), the correctly orientated DCNF being the preferred down-draft carburettor in this application (also having a much lower profile than the IDF). For ultimate power the DCOE carburettor is used even though the float-bowl direction matches that of the IDF (i.e. incorrect). The aforementioned carburettors are usually used in pairs (effectively giving one independently tuneable carburettor per engine-cylinder), though applications where a single DCNF/DCOE are used to feed a shared manifold do exist. DCNF's tend to be either , the larger 44-DCNF is deemed too large for the engine. Both 40-DCOE and 45-DCOE are commonly used where space allows.

For a normal street car DMTR carburetor is commonly used in sizes varying from 32/32, 32/34 to 34/34

MPI
Tuning of the early MPI systems has previously been difficult as the electronic control systems are analogue making them difficult to "re-map". Low-cost DIY Fuel Injection (FI) controllers (such as MegaSquirt) have made it easier to alter the characteristics of the early MPI systems and release similar potential as the DCNF/DCOE carburettors. It is possible to "chip" the later digital MPI systems though aftermarket FI controllers again give greater flexibility.

Throttle bodies
Individual FI Throttle Bodies (TBs) are available for mounting to DCNF and DCOE manifolds as well as custom-built FI systems which, with aftermarket controllers, give the most flexibility and control over fuelling out of all the options.

Motorcycle carburettors
Motorcycle, or "bike" carburettors, being a modern and cost-effective alternative to DCOE/DCNFs, have been adapted to work with the 128-derived engines. They potentially offer better control over fuelling than DCNF/DCOE, but their use on the Fiat SOHC engine is still in its infancy.

Camshaft profile
The camshaft was a main methods of varying the 128 series engines characteristics for different applications/markets. The high-revving oversquare design of the 128 engine lends itself to high-overlap high-duration cam profiles better than more traditional square/under-square engine designs without losing drivability. Though a beneficial characteristic for sports orientated engine the high-overlap high-duration cam design gives poor emissions output which was unacceptable under the tightened US emissions regulations. To remedy this (in addition to the introduction of MPI) camshafts for emission-restricted markets featured asthmatic low-lift, low-duration, low-overlap profiles totally unsuited to the nature of the 128 engine.

Factory produced camshafts

Aftermarket camshafts

Footnotes 

SOHC
Straight-four engines
Gasoline engines by model